Bardou may refer to:

Places

 Bardou, Dordogne, commune in the Dordogne, France
 Bardou, Guinea, town in the Kissidougou Prefecture in Guinea
 Bardou, Hérault, village in the Hérault, France

People with the surname

 Denis Albert Bardou (1841–1893), French optics manufacturer
 Emanuel Bardou (1744–1818), Swiss sculptor 
 Jorge Bardou (born 1965), Spanish tennis player
 Miguel Arias Bardou (1841–1915), Spanish born Cuban painter
 Pierre Bardou-Job (1826–92), French manufacturer of JOB cigarette papers